Somaqestan-e Sofla (also Romanized as Somāqestān-e Soflá) is a village in Khodabandehlu Rural District, in the Central District of Sahneh County, Kermanshah Province, Iran. At the 2006 census, its population was 19, in 5 families.

References 

Populated places in Sahneh County